Lydia Gurley (born 9 September 1984) is an Irish track and road cyclist. She competed at the 2016 UEC European Track Championships in the points race, team pursuit and elimination race events.

Major results
Source: 

2015
 2nd Road race, National Road Championships
 3rd Scratch, Belgian Xmas Meetings
2016
 2nd Points race, Dublin Track Cycling International
 3rd Time trial, National Road Championships
2017
 1st Points race, Trofeu Ciutat de Barcelona-Memorial Miquel Poblet
 2nd  Madison, UEC European Track Championships (with Lydia Boylan)
 3rd  Scratch, 2016–17 UCI Track Cycling World Cup, Cali
2018
 2nd Road race, National Road Championships
2019
 3rd  Scratch, 2019–20 UCI Track Cycling World Cup, Cambridge

References

External links

1984 births
Living people
Irish female cyclists
Irish track cyclists
People from Athenry
Cyclists at the 2019 European Games
European Games competitors for Ireland